Mary Lily May Quirk (7 December 1880 – 4 March 1952) was an Australian politician.

Born in Coonamble in New South Wales to farmer Julius Deal and his wife Emma Margaretta White, she was educated at Rozelle before commencing work as a domestic servant. She was later employed as a shop assistant with Grace Brothers, leading to her membership of the Shop Assistants' Union. On 28 September 1898 she married John Kelly, with whom she had three daughters and a son. After Kelly's death in 1926, she married Labor Party politician John Quirk on 9 February 1927.

Following her husband's death in 1938, Quirk was elected in 1939 to the New South Wales Legislative Assembly for the seat of Balmain, which she represented until 1950. She died soon after in 1952, and was buried in Field of Mars Cemetery from St Joseph's Roman Catholic Church in Rozelle.

References

 

1880 births
1952 deaths
Members of the New South Wales Legislative Assembly
Australian Labor Party members of the Parliament of New South Wales
20th-century Australian politicians
Women members of the New South Wales Legislative Assembly
19th-century Australian women
20th-century Australian women politicians